Vasyl Semenovych Stefanyk (May 14, 1871 – December 7, 1936) was an influential Ukrainian modernist writer and political activist. He was a member of the Austrian parliament from 1908 to 1918.

Biography

Early years
Vasyl Stefanyk was born on May 14, 1871 in the village of Rusiv in the family of a well-to-do peasant. He was born in the historical region of Pokuttia, then part of Austria-Hungary. Today it is part of Kolomyia Raion, Ivano-Frankivsk Oblast. He died on December 7, 1936 in the same village, Rusiv, at that time the part of Poland.

His primary education Stefanyk was at the Sniatyn City school.  He later studied at Polish gymnasia in Kolomyia and Drohobych. He was expelled from the Kolomea gymnasium for the participation in a revolutionary group. He eventually graduated from the Drohobych gymnasium, and enrolled in the University of Kraków in 1892.

In culture
Stefanyk's "Blue Book" was republished in Ukraine in 1966 under the title "The Maple Leaves" in an edition lavishly illustrated by Mykhaylo Turovsky.

Three stories from the "Blue Book" were the basis of the classic Ukrainian 1968 film "The Stone Cross" by Leonid Osyka.

Abroad
Stefanyk was deeply concerned with the destiny of Ukrainian immigrants to Canada and often mentioned them in his many writings. One of his stories, The Stone Cross (Kaminnyi Khrest), (later made into a movie) is a stirring account of an immigrant's departure from Stefanyk's native village, Rusiv. The man upon whom it is based died in 1911, in Hilliard, Alberta.

The monument that was erected to commemorate Vasyl' Stefanyk is located at the Ukrainian Cultural Heritage Village, east of Edmonton, Alberta. That is a statue that was a gift from Ukraine to the Association of United Ukrainian Canadians. The statue was sculpted by W. Skolozdra in 1971 to mark the 100th anniversary of Vasyl Stefanyk.

Bibliography
Lepky, Bohdan. Vasyl’ Stefanyk: Literaturna kharakterystyka (Lviv 1903)
Hrytsai, Ostap. Vasyl’ Stefanyk: Sproba krytychnoï kharakterystyky (Vienna 1921)
Kryzhanivs’kyi, S. Vasyl’ Stefanyk: Krytyko-biohrafichnyi narys (Kiev 1946)
Kostashchuk, V. Volodar dum selians’kykh (Lviv 1959)
Kushch, O. Vasyl’ Stefanyk: Bibliohrafichnyi pokazhchyk (Kiev 1961)
Kobzei, T. Velykyi riz’bar ukraïns’kykh selians’kykh dush (Toronto 1966)
Lesyn, V. Vasyl’ Stefanyk — maister novely (Kiev 1970)
Lutsiv, L. Vasyl’ Stefanyk — spivets’ ukraïns’koï zemli (New York–Jersey City 1971)
Struk, Danylo. A Study of Vasyl Stefanyk: The Pain at the Heart of Existence (Littleton, Colo 1973)
Wiśniewska, E. Wasyl Stefanyk w obliczu Młodej Polski (Wrocław 1986)
Chernenko, Oleksandra. Ekspresionizm u tvorchosti Vasylia Stefanyka (New York 1989)
Hnidan, O. Vasyl’ Stefanyk: Zhyttia i tvorchist’ (Kiev 1991)
Mokry, Włodzimierz. Ukraina Wasyla Stefanyka (Cracow 2001)
Struk, Danylo. The Encyclopedia of Ukraine, vol. 5 (1993)

External links
 Internet Encyclopedia of Ukraine: Vasyl Stefanyk
 "Eye on Culture" with Tania Stech, Kontakt TV, Vasyl Stefanyk
 
 
 Vasyl Stefanyk ″The Stone Cross″ Translated from the Ukrainian by Joseph Wiznuk in collaboration with С. H. Andrusyshen 

1871 births
1936 deaths
People from Ivano-Frankivsk Oblast
People from the Kingdom of Galicia and Lodomeria
Ukrainian Austro-Hungarians
Ukrainian Radical Party politicians
Members of the Austrian House of Deputies (1907–1911)
Members of the Austrian House of Deputies (1911–1918)
Ukrainian writers in Polish
Jagiellonian University alumni